The St. John's German Evangelical Lutheran Church, near Lyons, Nebraska, was built in 1902.  Also known as Deutsche Ev. Luth. St. Johannes Kirche, it was listed on the National Register of Historic Places in 1982.  The listing included two contributing buildings and a contributing site.  The location of the site is not disclosed by the National Register.

The building has been termed "an excellent example of a German folk version of the Gothic Revival style" and described as "one of the finest and least altered frame churches in Nebraska."

References

External links 
More photos of the St. Johannes Kirche (Lyons, Nebraska) at Wikimedia Commons

Lutheran churches in Nebraska
Buildings and structures in Burt County, Nebraska
Churches completed in 1902
Churches on the National Register of Historic Places in Nebraska
Joseph P. Guth buildings
Carpenter Gothic church buildings in Nebraska
Colonial Revival architecture in Nebraska
National Register of Historic Places in Burt County, Nebraska